When Women Rule (Spanish: Cuando las mujeres mandan) is a 1951 Cuban musical comedy film directed by Joseph P. Mawra and starring Federico Piñero, Alberto Garrido and Germán Valdés. The Mexican star Valdés, also known as Tin Tan, was loaned out by his Mexican studio for the film.

The soundtrack for the film was composed by Humberto Rodríguez Silva and Osvaldo Estivil.

Plot
Two Cuban soldiers fighting in the Korean War decide to desert and steal a plane which they end up crash landing on a tropical island. They find it is a militaristic female-dominated society, and they are promptly imprisoned. After a series of adventures they eventually take part in a revolution.

Partial cast
 Aidita Artigas 
 Xonia Benguría 
 Marcelo Chávez 
 Emilita Dago 
 Alberto Garrido 
 Fela Jar 
 Jorge Montalvan 
 Armando Orefiche 
 Federico Piñero 
 Sandra 
 Olga Uz 
 Germán Valdés

References

Bibliography 
 Alfonso J. García Osuna. The Cuban Filmography: 1897 through 2001. McFarland, 2003.

External links 
 

1951 films
1950s Spanish-language films
1951 musical comedy films
Films set in Korea
Cuban musical comedy films
Cuban black-and-white films